Antony Robic (born 5 March 1986) is a French professional footballer who plays as a midfielder for Ligue 2 club Bastia. He has previously played in Ligue 2 with Tours, Laval and Nancy.

Career
In January 2019, Robic moved to Laval of the Championnat National.

In July 2020, he joined Bastia, newly promoted to the Championnat National. The club went on to win the league and achieved successive promotions.

Career statistics

References

External links
 
 Antony Robic at foot-national.com
 
 

1986 births
Living people
Footballers from Marseille
French footballers
Association football midfielders
Toulouse FC players
Tours FC players
FC Martigues players
SO Romorantin players
Vannes OC players
Stade Lavallois players
AS Nancy Lorraine players
SC Bastia players
Ligue 1 players
Ligue 2 players
Championnat National players
Championnat National 2 players
Championnat National 3 players
French people of Breton descent